Shakedown is an original novel based on the U.S. television series Angel.

Plot summary
Doyle has a vision of a seismic shift, and everyone's guard goes up. After investigation, Angel is led to a group of Serpentine demons who live locally in a wealthy and private community. Despite close associations with telemarketing, this group of 'monsters' seems harmless and has no enemies, yet it has become the target of a clan of underground quake demons. The quake demons can reduce living things to a crushed mess.

Cordy and Doyle are dubious of their new clients, but Angel soon finds out he has much in common with this community.

Continuity

Supposed to be set early in Angel season 1, before the episode "Hero".
Angel mentions he went to Madrid and Lisbon during parts of 1755, never mentioned within Buffyverse canon.
Angel claims to have seen both Beethoven and Mozart perform as children.
Characters include Angel, Cordelia and Doyle.

Canonical issues

Angel books such as this one are not usually considered by fans as canonical. Some fans consider them stories from the imaginations of authors and artists, while other fans consider them as taking place in an alternative fictional reality. However unlike fan fiction, overviews summarising their story, written early in the writing process, were 'approved' by both Fox and Joss Whedon (or his office), and the books were therefore later published as officially Buffy/Angel merchandise.

External links
Cityofangel.com - Interview with this author about this book.

Reviews
Litefoot1969.bravepages.com - Review of this book by Litefoot
Teen-books.com - Reviews of this book
Shadowcat.name - Review of this book

Angel (1999 TV series) novels
2000 fantasy novels